Nigel Edwards may refer to:

 Nigel Edwards (footballer) (born 1950), Welsh footballer
 Nigel Edwards (golfer) (born 1968), Welsh golfer
 Nigel Edwards (health), health policy researcher